The 1953 Kansas Jayhawks football team represented the University of Kansas in the Big Seven Conference during the 1953 college football season. In their sixth season under head coach Jules V. Sikes, the Jayhawks compiled a 2–8 record (2–4 against conference opponents), finished tied for fourth in the Big Seven Conference, and were outscored by all opponents by a combined total of 179 to 83. They played their home games at Memorial Stadium in Lawrence, Kansas.

The team's statistical leaders included Don Hess with 369 rushing yards and 20 points scored, and John McFarland with 343 passing yards. Morris Kay and Bob Hantla were the team captains.

Schedule

References

Kansas
Kansas Jayhawks football seasons
Kansas Jayhawks football